Laekvere is a small borough in Vinni Parish, Lääne-Viru County, Estonia. Between 1991–2017 (until the administrative reform of Estonian municipalities) Laekvere was the administrative centre of Laekvere Parish. Laekvere has a population of 476 (as of 4 January 2010).

References

External links
Laekvere Parish 

Boroughs and small boroughs in Estonia